Charles Buckley is the name of:

Charles A. Buckley (1890–1967), U.S. Representative from New York
Charles Waldron Buckley (1835–1906), U.S. Representative from Alabama